Supreme Macedonian-Adrianople Committee  (SMAC),, also known as  Supreme Macedonian Committee  was a Bulgarian paramilitary and political organization, active in Bulgaria as well as in Macedonia and Thrace regions of the Ottoman Empire. It was based in Bulgaria from 1895 to 1905. Macedonian Bulgarian and Thracian Bulgarian emigrants in Bulgaria were a great number. Led by Trayko Kitanchev, they formed in 1895 the “Macedonian-Adrianople Organization”, at the head of which was “Supreme Macedonian-Adrianople Revolutionary Committee”. Its official declaration was also a struggle for autonomy of Macedonia and Thrace. At the same time, being impatient for the liberty to come sooner, and strongly convinced that it would come only with the help of the Bulgarian Army. Later they directed their efforts in activities for involving the country into war with the Ottoman Empire as for example during the Supreme Macedonian Committee chetas' action in 1895, and the Gorna Dzhumaya Uprising in 1902. As a rule most of the leaders were with stronger connections with the governments. At the end their main idea was, waging struggle for a direct unification with Bulgaria.

They became known as the "supremists" or "varhovists" since they were based outside of Macedonia. The supremists resorted to terrorism against the Ottomans in the hope of provoking a war and thus Bulgarian annexation of Macedonia. Several months after the formation of the Supreme Committee, the latter formed several detachments out of Bulgarian emigrants, revolutionaries, soldiers and officers from the army, almost all of them born in Macedonia or Thrace. Four detachments succeeded in entering Macedonia and only one - Thrace. For a time in the late 1890s the Internal Macedonian-Adrianople Revolutionary Organization (IMARO) leaders managed to gain control of the Supreme Committee but it soon split into two factions: one loyal to the IMARO and one led by some officers close to the Bulgarian prince. The second one staged an ill-fated uprising in Eastern Macedonia in 1902, where they were opposed militarily by local IMARO bands led by Yane Sandanski and Hristo Chernopeev, who were later to become the leaders of the IMARO left wing. During the Ilinden Uprising insurgent detachments of the Supreme Committee, held down a large Turkish force. These actions began on the day of the Feast of the Cross and did not involve the local population as much as in other regions, and were well to the east of Monastir and to the west of Thrace. After the failure of the uprising the Bulgarian government dissolved the committee under Ottoman pressure.

References

Sources

 Върховният Македоно - Одрински комитет / 1895 - 1903 / Автор: Светлозар Елдъров, издател: Иврай ООД, Година на издаване: 2003 
 Билярски, Цочо. Княжество България и македонският въпрос, т.1. Върховен македоно-одрински комитет 1895 - 1905 (Протоколи от конгресите), Българска историческа библиотека, 5, Иврай, София, 2002.
 Билярски, Цочо. Отношенията на Вътрешната македоно-одринска революционна организация и Върховния македоно-одрински комитет до 1902 г., ИДА, кн 59, 1990, стр. 233-291.
 Билярски, Цочо. Протоколите на Върховния македоно-одрински комитет между VII и VIII конгрес (1900-1901), ИДА, 1986.
 Билярски, Цочо. Статути на Върховния македоно-одрински комитет, в: „Военноисторически сборник“, 1984, №2.
 Билярски, Цочо, И. Бурилкова, Писма от дейци на Върховния македонски комитет и на Българските македоно-одрински революционни комитети в архива на д-р Константин Стоилов (1895-1898 г.), Македонски преглед, кн. 4, 1996, стр. 101-128.
 Георгиев, Георги. Македоно-одринското движение в Кюстендилски окръг (1895-1903), Македонски научен институт, София, 2008.
 Елдъров, Светлозар. Върховният македоно-одрински комитет и Македоно-одринската организация в България (1895 - 1903), Иврай, София, 2003.
 Елдъров, Светлозар. Кореспонденцията между генерал Иван Цончев и капитан Александър Протогеров за македоно-одринското революционно движение (октомври 1901 - юли 1903 г.), ИВИНД, 1991, кн. 52, стр. 118-143.
 Елдъров, Светлозар, Т. Петров. Офицерите от Българската армия на Княжество България в Илинденско-Преображенското въстание 1903 година, ВИС, 1988, кн. 4, стр. 137-146.
 Николов, Б. Протоколи от районните конгреси на Върховния македоно-одрински комитет през 1905 г., ВИС, 1984, кн. 3, стр. 164-179.
 Пандев, К. Вътрешната организация и Върховният комитет 1899-1901, Етюд историк, 1973.

See also
Trayko Kitanchev
Internal Macedonian Revolutionary Organization
History of Bulgaria
Ilinden Uprising

Bulgarian revolutionary organisations
History of Macedonia (region)
Macedonia under the Ottoman Empire
Ottoman Thrace
Organizations established in 1895
1895 establishments in Bulgaria
Defunct organizations based in Bulgaria
Internal Macedonian Revolutionary Organization
Revolutionary organizations against the Ottoman Empire